Anna Maria Cantù (13 January 1923 – 23 July 2008) was an Italian sprinter. She competed in the women's 4 × 100 metres relay at the 1948 Summer Olympics.

References

External links
 

1923 births
2008 deaths
Athletes (track and field) at the 1948 Summer Olympics
Italian female sprinters
Olympic athletes of Italy
Place of birth missing
Olympic female sprinters